Full Dark, No Stars, published in November 2010, is a collection of four novellas by American author Stephen King, all dealing with the theme of retribution. One of the novellas, 1922, is set in Hemingford Home, Nebraska, which is the home of Mother Abagail from King's epic novel The Stand (1978), the town the adult Ben Hanscom moves to in It (1986), it is also where Alice and Billy stop for a while towards the end of the book Billy Summers, and the setting of the short story "The Last Rung on the Ladder" (1978). The collection won the 2011 Bram Stoker Award for Best Collection, and the 2011 British Fantasy Award for Best Collection. Also, 1922 was nominated for the 2011 British Fantasy Award for Best Novella.

Contents
The four novellas are:

 1922
 Big Driver
 Fair Extension
 A Good Marriage

Background information
The titles of the novellas and their synopses were announced on the author's official website on April 2, 2010. This is King's third collection of four novellas after Different Seasons (1982) and Four Past Midnight (1990).

Release
Announced on King's official site on February 16, 2010, it was published on November 9, 2010. Cemetery Dance Publications has released several limited edition iterations of the book: a Slipcased Gift Edition, a Signed Limited Edition, and a Lettered Edition shortly after the original hardcover edition. The paperback edition released on May 24, 2011 contains an additional new short story "Under the Weather" written in 2011

Critical response
The book received generally positive reviews. The review aggregator website Book Marks reported that 35% of critics gave the book a "rave" review, while 47% of the critics expressed "positive" impressions, based on a sample of 17 reviews.

The Washington Post, in its review of the book, called Full Dark, No Stars "satisfyingly bleak" and "a disturbing, fascinating book." Amazon placed the book at #25 out of 100 in its "Best Books of 2010" list.

In other media
Both A Good Marriage and Big Driver were adapted into films, with screenplays written by Stephen King and Richard Christian Matheson respectively. A Good Marriage was released theatrically in 2014, while Big Driver was released as a television film the same year. 1922 was adapted as a Netflix original film and released October 2017. Actor Thomas Jane portrayed the main role.

References

2010 short story collections
American short story collections
Charles Scribner's Sons books
Short story collections by Stephen King